York City Rowing Club is a rowing club by the River Ouse in York, England. It has over 200 members, of all ages. The boathouse is on the west (here briefly south) bank of the river next to Lendal Bridge and in Memorial Gardens. The club has modern buildings but is three years older than the oldest coastal rowing club in Britain, Dover; it is 25 years younger than the oldest non-academic rowing club, Leander.

History

The present boathouse is a postwar building. Its boat storage is overcrowded owing to the size of the club and the level of activity. A refurbishment plan is underway, and it is hoped to update also the changing facilities, gym and bar/lounge.

Location
The clubhouse is next to Lendal Bridge along West Esplanade. This stretch is almost free from recreational and commercial traffic. The public footpath and cycle (towpath) is between the river and boathouse. Wildlife encountered includes herons, kingfishers, otters and at least one seal. Downstream the river is wider with less severe bends, but is less interesting and, especially in summer, is sometimes congested with excursion craft, cabin cruisers and hired motor-boats. Many of the bridges are single-span.

Club colours
These are white, with a narrow band each of purple, black and gold diagonally.

Events
The club runs or assists with five events throughout the year, including 2 heads and 3 regattas.

Heads
 Yorkshire Head (a Yorkshire Rowing Council event in Spring)

This is raced from a start near the A1237 road bridge to a finish near the club. Landmarks on the course are: Maddies' Landing (a derelict wharf once serving the old mental hospital at Clifton), Clifton Bends and Bridge (a sharp S-bend under a road bridge), St. Peter's School boathouse on stroke-side about 800 m from the finish and finally (with 200 m to go) the Scarborough Bridge carrying a railway across the river.

 Autumn Sculls (in September)

Started in 2015 to provide early season head racing in small boats. The course is 4,500m downstream from Rawcliffe Landing near the bypass bridge to just above Scarborough Railway Bridge in the city centre. Landmarks include Maddies' Landing (a derelict wharf once serving the old mental hospital at Clifton) and Clifton Bends and Bridge (a sharp S-bend under a road bridge).

 Small Boats Head (in November)
A shorter course, upstream from a point at Fulford upstream of the A64 road bridge to a finish at the King's Staithe. The course passes York University boathouse on rowers' left, under the Millennium foot-bridge then passes the confluence of the R. Fosse, also on bow-side, shortly before the finish.

Regattas
 Spring regatta
 Summer regatta

Former events 

 Sprint regatta

This regatta was discontinued in 2012 due to the lack of interest.

In the media
York City Rowing Club is featured often in the York Press. Recently, they have written two articles about York City Rowing Club, one about a grant received, and another about an elderly rower (a former Olympian).

Honours

Henley Royal Regatta

British champions

References

Further reading

External links
 Official website

Sport in York
Rowing clubs in England
River Ouse, Yorkshire
1843 establishments in England
Sports clubs established in 1843